Montipora is a genus of Scleractinian corals in the phylum Cnidaria. Members of the genus Montipora may exhibit many different growth morphologies. With eighty five known species, Montipora is the second most species rich coral genus after Acropora.

Description

Growth morphologies for the genus Montipora include submassive, laminar, foliaceous, encrusting, and branching. It is not uncommon for a single Montipora colony to display more than one growth morphology. Healthy Montipora corals can be a variety of colors, including orange, brown, pink, green, blue, purple, yellow, grey, or tan. Although they are typically uniform in color, some species, such as Montipora spumosa or Montipora verrucosa, may display a mottled appearance.

Montipora corals have the smallest corallites of any coral family. Columellae are not present. Coenosteum and corallite walls are porous, which can result in elaborate structures. The coenosteum of each Montipora species is different, making it useful for identification. Polyps are typically only extended at night.

Montipora corals are commonly mistaken for members of the genus Porites based on their visual similarities, however, Porites can be distinguished from Montipora by examining the structure of the corallites.

Distribution
Montipora corals are common on reefs and lagoons of the Red Sea, the western Indian Ocean and the southern Pacific Ocean, but are entirely absent in the Atlantic Ocean.

Ecology
Montipora corals are hermaphroditic broadcast spawners. Spawning typically happens in spring. The eggs of Montipora corals already contain zooxanthellae, so none is obtained from the environment. This process is known as direct or vertical transmission.

Montipora corals are preyed upon by corallivorous fish, such as butterflyfish. Montipora corals are known to host endo- and ectoparasites such as Allopodion mirum and Xarifia extensa. A currently undescribed species of nudibranch in the genus Phestilla has also been reported in the scientific and aquarium hobbyist literature to feed on the genus. 

Montipora corals are susceptible to the same stresses as other Scleractinian corals, such as anthropogenic pollution, sediment, algal growth, and other competitive organisms.

Evolutionary history
A 2007 study found that the genus Montipora formed a strongly supported clade with Anacropora, making it the genus with the closest genetic relationship to Montipora. It is thought that Anacropora evolved from Montipora relatively recently.

Gallery

Species

 Montipora aequituberculata Bernard, 1897
 Montipora altasepta  Nemenzo, 1967
 Montipora angulata Lamarck, 1816
 Montipora aspergillus Veron, DeVantier & Turak, 2000
 Montipora australiensis Bernard, 1897
 Montipora biformis Nemenzo, 1988
 Montipora cactus Bernard, 1897
 Montipora calcarea Bernard, 1897
 Montipora calculata Dana, 1846
 Montipora capitata Dana, 1846
 Montipora capricornis Veron, 1985
 Montipora cebuensis Nemenzo, 1976
 Montipora circumvallata Ehrenberg, 1834
 Montipora cocosensis Vaughan, 1918
 Montipora confusa Nemenzo, 1967
 Montipora conspicua Nemenzo, 1979
 Montipora contorta Nemenzo & Montecillo, 1981
 Montipora corbettensis Veron & Wallace, 1984
 Montipora crassituberculata Bernard, 1897
 Montipora cryptus Veron, 2000
 Montipora danae Milne Edwards & Haime, 1851
 Montipora delicatula Veron, 2000
 Montipora digitata Dana, 1846
 Montipora dilatata Studer, 1901
 Montipora echinata Veron, DeVantier & Turak, 2000
 Montipora edwardsi Bernard, 1897
 Montipora efflorescens Bernard, 1897
 Montipora effusa Dana, 1846
 Montipora ehrenbergi Verrill, 1872
 Montipora explanata Brüggemann, 1879
 Montipora flabellata Studer, 1901
 Montipora florida Nemenzo, 1967
 Montipora floweri Wells, 1954
 Montipora foliosa Pallas, 1766
 Montipora foveolata Dana, 1846
 Montipora friabilis Bernard, 1897
 Montipora gaimardi Bernard, 1897
 Montipora gracilis Klunzinger, 1879
  Montipora grisea Bernard, 1897
 Montipora hemispherica Veron, 2000
 Montipora hirsuta Nemenzo, 1967
 Montipora hispida Dana, 1846Montipora hodgsoni Veron, 2000
 Montipora hoffmeisteri Wells, 1954
 Montipora incrassata Dana, 1846
 Montipora informis Bernard, 1897
 Montipora kellyi Veron, 2000
 Montipora lobulata Bernard, 1897
 Montipora mactanensis Nemenzo, 1979
 Montipora malampaya Nemenzo, 1967
 Montipora maldivensis Pillai & Scheer, 1976
 Montipora manauliensis Pillai, 1967
 Montipora meandrina Ehrenberg, 1834
 Montipora millepora Crossland, 1952
 Montipora mollis Bernard, 1897
 Montipora monasteriata Forskåi, 1775
 Montipora niugini Veron, 2000
 Montipora nodosa Dana, 1846
 Montipora orientalis Nemenzo, 1967
 Montipora pachytuberculata Veron, DeVantier & Turak
 Montipora palawanensis Veron, 2000
 Montipora patula Verrill, 1870
 Montipora peltiformis Bernard, 1897
 Montipora porites Veron, 2000
 Montipora samarensis Nemenzo, 1967
 Montipora saudii Veron, DeVantier & Turak
 Montipora setosa Nemenzo, 1976
 Montipora sinuosa Pillai & Scheer, 1976
 Montipora spongiosa Ehrenberg, 1834
 Montipora spongodes Bernard, 1897
 Montipora spumosa Lamarck, 1816
 Montipora stellata Bernard, 1897
 Montipora stilosa 
 Montipora suvadivae Pillai & Scheer, 1976
 Montipora taiwanensis Veron, 2000
 Montipora tortuosa Dana, 1846
 Montipora tuberculosa Lamarck, 1816
 Montipora turgescens Bernard, 1897
 Montipora turtlensis Veron & Wallace, 1984
 Montipora undata Bernard, 1897
 Montipora venosa Ehrenberg, 1834
 Montipora verrilli Vaughan, 1907
 Montipora verrucosa Lamarck, 1816
 Montipora verruculosa Veron, 2000
 Montipora vietnamensis'' Veron, 2000

References

Acroporidae
Coral reefs
Scleractinia genera